Umananda Devaloi (Pron: ˈʊməˌnændə ˈdeɪvəˌlɔɪ) is a Shiva temple located at the Umananda Island (Peacock Island) in the middle of river

Brahmaputra just opposite the office of the Deputy Commissioner of Kamrup or the Kachari Ghat in Guwahati.

It is known as smallest inhabited riverine island in the world. Country boats that are available on the bank of Brahmaputra take the visitors to the island.

Legend
Siva is said to have resided here in the form of Bhayananda. According to the Kalika Purana, in the beginning of the creation Siva sprinkled ashes (bhasma) at this place and imparted knowledge to Parvati (his consort). It is said that, when Siva was in meditation on this hillock, Kamadeva interrupted his yoga and was therefore burnt to ashes by the fire of Siva’s anger and hence the hillock got the name Bhasmacala.

This mountain is also called Bhasmakuta. The Kalika Purana states that Urvasikunda is situated here and here resides the goddess Urvasi who brings Amrit (nectar) for the enjoyment of Kamakhya and hence the island got the name Urvasi Island.

Presiding Deity
The presiding deity of the temple is Umananda (Tatrasti bhagavan sambhu- ruma- nandakarah Prabhu). The name 'Umananda' comes from the two Hindi words, namely 'Uma', which was another name for Lord Shiva’s wife and 'Ananda' which means happiness. In fact, Peacock Island is one of the smallest inhabited island and possibly one of the most beautiful too. The surroundings of the temple and the divine but understated beauty of the island make it a haven for nature lovers.

It is believed that, people worship here on the Amavasya day when it falls on Monday brings the highest bliss. The Siva Chaturdasi is the most colourful festival that is held here annually. Many devotees come to the temple on this occasion for the worship of the deity.

History
Evidence of a stone temple belonging to the post-Gupta period can be seen on the site. The site has stone sculptures and carvings belonging to the early medieval period. Achaturbhuja stone female figure still exists here besides rock-cut figures of Ganesha and a cave.

Brick temple of Umananda was built in 1694 CE by the Bar Phukan Garhganya Handique by the order of King Gadadhar Singha (1681–1696), one of the eldest and strongest rulers of the Ahom dynasty. The temple was desecrated by the Mughal Army.

The original temple was however immensely damaged by a devastating earthquake of 1897. Later, it was reconstructed by a rich local merchant who chose to inscribe the interior part of a Siva temple with Vaishnavite slogans.

Structure
The temple has inherited some rock-cut figures, which speak passionately of the masterly skill of the Assamese craftsmen. The sculptures here show that the worshippers there followed all the principal Hindu gods. Representations of Surya, Ganesha, Shiva and Devi (with a scorpion as emblem) in addition to those of Visnu and his ten incarnations (avatar) are found here. The main shrine is reached by a flight of steep steps. The Umananda temple was crafted beautifully by the skilled Assamese workmen. Aside from Lord Shiva, there are 10 other Hindu Gods whose idols reside in the shrines.

Aside from being a place of worship, The Umananda temple is also a pleasurable exception to the typical places of worship. Devoid of the cacophony of forceful religion, this place has a serene environment which makes you want to sit down for a while and absorb the beauty of the place.

Access 
The Peacock Island can be accessed from Guwahati and North Guwahati by ferries and steamers. One can hire a ferry from Sukleshwar ghat or Fancy Bazar Ghat. This is expensive but one can get the feel of the river and its surroundings without any interventions. This is most ideal for couples and family trips. However, a much convenient and cheaper transport has been provided by Inland Water Transport, which connects the Peacock island to Guwahati from Uzanbazar Ferry Ghat also known as ka hari ghat. The fees is as low as 20 rupees per person.150+ stairs 
have to be climbed to reach the temple.

Gallery

See also 

 Hindu pilgrimage sites
 National Geological Monuments of India
 List of Hindu temples
 Tourism in India
 Yatra

References 

Shiva temples in Assam
Kamrup district
Hindu temples in Guwahati
Hindu pilgrimage sites
Tourism in Assam